The Emsco B-2 Challenger  was a US three-engined,  six passenger aircraft flown in 1929. Only two were built and they were quite soon converted into two different Emsco types, one with one engine and the other with two.

Design

The Emsco Corporation took its name from the initials of its founder E.M Smith. In early 1929 Emsco bought out the Albatross Corporation and their aircraft, designed by Charles Rocheville. One of these was the American Albatross B-1 of 1928, a high wing braced monoplane with a single engine producing  and with accommodation for six passengers. The Emsco Challenger was a development of it and was quite similar apart from having three engines totalling .  It was intended as the first of a range of similar Emsco aircraft, differing in having one or two engines.

The Challenger's wing was built in two parts, both rectangular in plan out to semi-elliptical tips, which met on top of the fuselage and were mounted with 1.5° dihedral. They had wooden structures built around two box spars and were fabric covered. Parallel struts from beyond mid-span braced the spars to the lower fuselage longerons and the rear struts were also braced near their midpoints to the upper longerons; all struts were enclosed in wide, airfoil section fairings.  Its inset ailerons were long and narrow.

The fuselage of the Challenger was built around a rectangular cross-section chrome-molybdenum steel frame and given an oval cross-section by bulkheads.  The cabin region was plywood skinned; aft, formers and stringers were fabric covered. One of the three , six-cylinder Curtiss Challenger radial engines was in the nose under a wide-chord fairing.  The other two were mounted uncowled on the wing bracing struts, assisted by more struts between engine and upper fuselage and others between the struts. The pilots occupied an enclosed cockpit, placed high and just ahead of the wing leading edge, with side-by-side seating and dual control. A passageway connected the cockpit and the windowed, well furnished passenger cabin. Cabin and cockpit were accessed by a door on the port side, equipped with a built-in ladder, via a compartment containing a curtained-off lavatory and a luggage space.

The empennage, like the fuselage, was steel framed and fabric covered. Both fin and tailplane, the latter mounted at mid-fuselage height, had straight, swept leading edges and carried balanced control surfaces with straight, unswept rear edges and round tips.  The rudder was deep, extending to the keel, and worked within an elevator cut-out. The Challenger had a fixed tailwheel undercarriage. Its mainwheels were on faired, cranked axles hinged from the central fuselage underside, braced by drag struts hinged further aft; these members were enclosed in balsa and fabric airfoil fairings. Short, vertical oleo legs were attached to the bottom of the outer engine mountings.  The wheels had independent Bendix brakes and were almost entirely enclosed in large dural tube, fabric covered fairings. A small tailwheel was mounted on a rubber-sprung pylon.

Development
The Challenger was flown for the first time in June 1929 by Jack Reid at Long Beach, California. Immediately afterwards it toured the U.S. West Coast, combining test and publicity flights.

Two were built and both were later modified into different types by changing engines.  The first became an Emsco B-3A in 1930 with a single  Pratt & Whitney Wasp C and the second, with two  Wright J-5s, was the only Emsco B-5.

Variants

Zenith B-1 Albatross precursor

Emsco B-2 Challenger As described

Emsco B-3 Similar to the B-2 but with a greater span. Five were built. One went to Mexico and one to Rumania. Another B-3, initially named he City of Tacoma was used on an unsuccessful attempt to cross the North Pacific, flown by Harold Bromley and Harold Gatty in 1930. In August 1931, renamed the Clarissa Madge it made a successful crossing,  The prototype was lost at the end of an attempt on the world duration record; it seems that its pilot, Jack Reid, fell asleep after setting a record time of 38 hr 40 min. Reid died in the crash.

Emsco B-3AOne of the B-2s was converted to a single Pratt & Whitney Wasp C engine; it retained the shorter span wing of the B-2 but had the longer fuselage of the B-3 and its extra seat.  It achieved its Approved Type Certificate early in 1931. Only the B-3A, not the B-3, appeared in contemporary advertisements.

Emsco B-5 This was a twin engine, six passenger conversion of the other B-2 with  Wright J-6-9 nine-cylinder radial engines. It was making early test flights in March 1930.   The only B-5 was sold to the Compania Nacional de Aviacion in Guatemala in July 1933.

Specifications (B-2)

References

1920s United States civil utility aircraft
Trimotors
High-wing aircraft
Aircraft first flown in 1929